Oulema erichsonii is a species of leaf beetle, family Chrysomelidae. It is widespread in Europe. It was first described by German entomologist Christian Wilhelm Ludwig Eduard Suffrian in 1841.

Oulema erichsonii is a rare species in the UK where it has been recorded only in Somerset, including at Ham Wall reserve. It is highly endangered due to habitat loss; one study performed in Tübingen, Germany, found this species exclusively in a sample of autumnally unmown lawn, but not in mown lawn samples.

References

Criocerinae
Beetles of Europe
Beetles described in 1841
Taxa named by Christian Wilhelm Ludwig Eduard Suffrian